Anarchist Seeds Beneath the Snow is a 2006 book about anarchism and left-libertarian thought in Britain written by David Goodway and published by Liverpool University Press, then republished in 2011 by PM Press.

References

Further reading

External links 
 

2006 non-fiction books
Books about anarchism
Liverpool University Press books